Tuil is a village in the Netherlands.

TUIL may refer to:
 Texas University Interscholastic League, Texas scholastic extracurricular governing body
 Tromsdalen UIL Norwegian sports club

See also 
 TUIL Arena, a stadium in Norway
 Karine Tuil (born 1972), French novelist